Satyen Sen, (28 March 1907 - 5 January 1981) was a historian of Bengali literature from Bangladesh.

Early life
Satyen was born in Tangibari, Munshigonj. His father was Darinimohan Sen. He passed the entrance examination in 1924. He went to Kolkata and got involved in leftist movement. Later on he joined Jugantor (a political party). He then passed F.A. and B.A. exams. He started studying history at Calcutta University. He was arrested for his association with Jugantor several times in 1949, 1954, 1958 and 1965.

Works
He was influenced by Marxist ideology and his ideology is reflected through his literary work. Apart from his political activities and literary works, Sen also worked as an assistant editor of The Sangbad. He was also the founder of Udichi (a cultural organization of Bangladesh). 
As a novelist he is known mostly for his historical novels. He wrote twelve novels along with eight books on history and twenty books of other different categories. He started to write novels at a very late age.

Novels
Bhorer Bihongi (The Bird of the Dawn, 1959)
Obhishopto Nogori (The Cursed City, 1967)
Paper Sontan (The Children of Sin, 1969)
Ruddhodar Muktopran (The Door Closed, The Mind Open, 1973); 
Padochinho (The Footmarks, 1968)
Seyana (The Shrewd, 1968)
Kumarajiva (1969)
Vidrohi Kaivarto (The Rebellious Kaivartos, 1969)
Alberuni (1969)
Sat Nombor Ward (Ward Number Seven, 1969)
Uttoron (Reaching the Destination, 1970)
E’Kul Bhange O  Kul Gore (This Shore Erodes That Shore Rises, 1971)
Ma (Mother, 1970)
Oporajeo (The Unbeatable, 1970).

Awards
Bangla Academy Literary Award (1970)
Ekushey Padak (1986)

References

External links

Bangladeshi male writers
Bengali-language writers
1907 births
1981 deaths
Bengali Hindus
Bangladeshi Hindus
University of Calcutta alumni
Recipients of the Ekushey Padak
Recipients of Bangla Academy Award
Indian male writers

People from Munshiganj District